James Fitton may refer to:

 James Fitton (artist) (1899–1982), English painter
 James Fitton (priest) (1805–1881), American Catholic missionary